Archibald Hunter Arrington Williams (October 22, 1842 – September 5, 1895) was a Democratic U.S. Congressman from North Carolina between 1891 and 1893.

Born near Louisburg, North Carolina, he attended local schools and then Emory and Henry College in Virginia. He enlisted in the Confederate Army during the American Civil War and served in the Army of Northern Virginia.

After the Confederate surrender, Williams returned to Granville County, North Carolina, and developed the Oxford and Henderson Railroad, of which he was the president. In 1883, he was elected to the North Carolina House of Representatives for a single term.

In 1890, Williams was elected to the 52nd United States Congress and served for a single term; he was defeated for re-election in 1892 by Republican Thomas Settle III.

Williams died in Chase City, Virginia, in 1895 and is buried in Oxford, North Carolina.

References

1842 births
1895 deaths
Democratic Party members of the North Carolina House of Representatives
People from Louisburg, North Carolina
Democratic Party members of the United States House of Representatives from North Carolina
19th-century American politicians